Randy Arozarena González (born February 28, 1995) is a Cuban-Mexican professional baseball outfielder for the Tampa Bay Rays of Major League Baseball (MLB). He previously played for the St. Louis Cardinals. In 2020, Arozarena set the MLB record for home runs in a single postseason with 10. Four of those came against the Houston Astros in the 2020 American League Championship Series, netting him series MVP honors. The following year, he won the AL Rookie of the Year award.

Professional career

Cuban and Mexican career
During the 2013–14 and 2014–15 seasons, Arozarena played for Vegueros de Pinar del Río of the Cuban National Series. In his final season, he slashed .291/.412/.419 with three home runs, 24 RBIs, and 15 stolen bases over 74 games.

In 2016, Arozarena arrived in Mexico and had brief stints in the Mérida Winter League, in the Norte de México League, and with the Toros de Tijuana of the Mexican League, before playing for the Mayos de Navojoa of the Mexican Pacific League during the winter.

St. Louis Cardinals

Minor leagues
Arozarena signed with St. Louis Cardinals as an international free agent in July 2016 for $1.25 million. He made his minor league debut in 2017 and spent his first full professional season with both the Palm Beach Cardinals, with whom he was named a Florida State League All-Star, and the Springfield Cardinals, posting a combined .266 batting average with 11 home runs, 49 RBIs and 18 stolen bases over 121 games between both clubs. Following the season, he returned to the Mexican Pacific League to play for the Mayos de Navojoa for the 2017–2018 season, where he slashed .292/.366/.558 with 14 home runs and 37 RBIs in 64 games. That season the Mayos made it to the championship series. Although the team did not win the series, Arozarena had a game winning hit in the bottom of the ninth inning in game 6. Arozarena was a non-roster invitee to 2018 spring training. He began the season with the Memphis Redbirds. In July 2018, he was selected to represent the Cardinals in the 2018 All-Star Futures Game. Arozarena also spent time during the season with Springfield. With Memphis, he helped them win the Pacific Coast League title, and was named a co-MVP of the PCL playoffs alongside teammate Tommy Edman. Over 113 games between Memphis and Springfield, he batted .274/.359/.433 with 12 home runs, 49 RBIs, and 26 stolen bases. Arozarena returned to play for Mayos de Navojoa in 2018 for the third time, but appeared in only 15 games.

2019 season
Arozarena began the 2019 season on the injured list with Memphis due to a fractured hand suffered during spring training. He returned to play in May with Springfield before being promoted back to Memphis in June.

On August 12, 2019, the Cardinals selected Arozarena's contract and promoted him to the major leagues. He made his major league debut on August 14 versus the Kansas City Royals. Over 19 games with St. Louis, Arozarena hit .300 with one home run, two RBIs, and two stolen bases.

Tampa Bay Rays

2020 season
On January 9, 2020, Arozarena was traded to the Tampa Bay Rays (along with José Martínez and the Cardinals’ Competitive Balance Round A Draft Pick) for Matthew Liberatore, Edgardo Rodriguez, and the Rays’ Competitive Balance Round B Draft Pick. Over 23 games for the 2020 season, Arozarena batted .281 with seven home runs and 11 RBIs.

In Game 7 of the American League Championship Series against the Houston Astros, Arozarena hit a two-run home run, surpassing Evan Longoria for most home runs by a rookie in the postseason. Arozarena was named the MVP of the ALCS, becoming the first rookie position player to win the award. In the series, he hit .321 with four home runs and six RBIs. In the World Series, Arozarena hit home runs in the third, fourth, and sixth games, breaking the all-time record for most home runs in a single postseason. In Game 3, he surpassed Derek Jeter for most hits by a rookie in the postseason. In Game 5, he recorded his 27th hit in the postseason, surpassing Pablo Sandoval for the most hits in a single postseason. Arozarena attributed his playoff power stroke to wearing a special pair of lucky cowboy boots, which he calls his "power boots".

2021 season
For the 2021 season, Arozarena batted .274/.356/.459 with 20 home runs, 69 RBIs, 20 stolen bases and 129 OPS+ in 141 games. During game one of the 2021 ALDS against the Boston Red Sox, Arozarena became the first player to hit a home run and steal home in the same game during the playoffs. Following the season's end, Arozarena won the AL Rookie of the Year Award, becoming the first Ray to do so since Wil Myers in 2013.

2022 season
In 2022 while he stole 32 bases (tied for third in the majors) he also led the major leagues in caught stealing with 12; he batted .269/.344/.463 with a solid 124 OPS+.

International career 

Before his defection , Arozarena represented his home country of Cuba at the youth level, playing in the 2011 U-16 Baseball World Cup and the 2013 18U Baseball World Cup in Taichung. In the 2013 tournament, Cuba finished with the bronze medal.

Arozarena announced his intention to play under the Mexican flag in 2020, saying "I feel like I represent Mexico. I have a daughter in Mexico, and I’d do it in honor of her and for the part of my career that I spent in Mexico, and for all the friends I’ve made in Mexico.” In October 2022, it was officially announced that Arozarena intended to represent Mexico in the 2023 World Baseball Classic. 

For his performance in the pool stage of the tournament, he was named the most valuable player of Pool C, over Mike Trout.

Personal life 
Arozarena has a daughter who was born in Mexico in 2018. His younger brother is soccer player Raiko Arozarena, who currently plays as a goalkeeper for the Tampa Bay Rowdies of the USL Championship. He became a Mexican citizen in 2022 and is representing the country in the World Baseball Classic.

On November 23, 2020, Arozarena was arrested in Mexico’s Yucatán state after allegedly trying to kidnap his two-year-old daughter from her mother and assaulting the woman’s father. He was released two days later as the mother of the child did not press charges.

In 2020, a film based on Arozarena's life was reportedly in the works with an estimated release between 2022 and 2023; however, there have been no updates since then.

See also

 List of baseball players who defected from Cuba
 List of Major League Baseball players from Cuba
 Tampa Bay Rays award winners and league leaders

References

External links

1995 births
Living people
American League Championship Series MVPs
Cuban expatriate baseball players in Mexico
Major League Baseball players from Cuba
Cuban expatriate baseball players in the United States
Major League Baseball outfielders
Major League Baseball Rookie of the Year Award winners
Mayos de Navojoa players
Memphis Redbirds players
Palm Beach Cardinals players
Baseball players from Havana
Springfield Cardinals players
St. Louis Cardinals players
Tampa Bay Rays players
Toros de Tijuana players
Vegueros de Pinar del Rio players
Defecting Cuban baseball players
2023 World Baseball Classic players